Crystal's Pony Tale is a children's action-adventure game developed by Artech Digital Entertainment and published by Sega for the Mega Drive/Genesis in 1994. The game features the adventures of protagonist Crystal Pony, who journeys to rescue her friends and stop an evil witch. It was created in hopes to attract little girls to the platform.

Gameplay
The game has seven areas, each holding multiple secrets. There are three difficulties - easy, medium, and hard. There is classical music featured throughout the game; especially Brahms' 4th Symphony.

Plot
The evil Storm Witch has cast a spell that imprisoned Crystal Pony's friends in her castle in order to rule Ponyland. The player's role is to collect crystals to free the ponies and defeat the witch once and for all, after which the ponies can live, finally, "happily ever after."

Reception
Game Developer reported the game "was criticized for featuring too much pink in its graphics."

References

External links

1994 video games
Action-adventure games
Cancelled Master System games
Fantasy video games
Fictional horses
North America-exclusive video games
Platform games
Sega Genesis games
Sega Genesis-only games
Side-scrolling video games
Single-player video games
Video games developed in Canada
Video games featuring female protagonists
Video games about witchcraft
Sega video games
Artech Studios games